HMAS Basilisk is a former Royal Australian Navy (RAN) shore naval base, located in Port Moresby, Papua New Guinea.

History
The first RAN naval base in Papua New Guinea, the base was commissioned on 1 January 1943 under the command of Commander R.B.A. Hunt RAN, who was previously the Naval Officer in Charge Port Moresby. Hunt was the hydrographic surveyor who had surveyed Port Moresby.

Basilisk was paid off on 17 December 1945.

HMAS Basilisk was re-commissioned under CMDR P. Paffard, RAN on 14 November 1974 to provide administrative support for RAN personnel serving with the Papua New Guinea Defence Force.

The naval base was finally decommissioned in 1983.

See also

List of former Royal Australian Navy bases
Pacific War

References

External links
Naval Historical Society of Australia
Australia War Memorial

Basilisk
Port Moresby
1983 disestablishments in Papua New Guinea
1943 establishments in the Territory of New Guinea
Military units and formations established in 1943
Military units and formations disestablished in 1983